Federica is a given name. Notable people with the name include:

Federica Angeli (born 1975), Italian journalist
Federica Biscia (born 1980), Italian swimmer
Federica Bonsignori (born 1967), professional tennis player from Italy
Federica Brunetti (born 1988), Italian professional basketball player
Federica Carta (field hockey) (born 2000), Italian field hockey player
Federica D'Astolfo (born 1966), Italian international footballer
Federica Dal Ri (born 1980), Italian female long-distance runner
Federica De Bortoli (born 1976), Italian voice actress
Federica Di Criscio (born 1993), Italian football defender or midfielder
Federica Dieni (born 1986), Italian politician
Federica Di Giacomo, Italian director
Federica Faiella (born 1981), Italian ice dancer
Federica Falzon (born 2003), Maltese child opera singer
Federica Felini (born 1983), Italian model, singer and television personality
Federica Foghetti (born 1968), Italian modern pentathlete
Federica Fontana (born 1977), Italian television sports announcer
Federica Gori (1970–2008), Italian pornographic actress and television personality
Federica Guidi (born 1969), Italian businesswoman
Federica Guzmán (born 1981), Miss Venezuela World 2006
Federica Haumüller (born 1972), Argentinian professional tennis player
Federica Luppi, astronomer
Federica Manzon (born 1981), Italian writer
Federica Marchionni (born 1971), Italian-American businesswoman
Federica Mogherini (born 1973), Italian politician
Federica Montseny (1905–1994), Spanish anarchist, intellectual and Minister of Health
Federica Moro (born 1965), Italian model and actress
Federica Masolin (born 1985), Italian sports journalist and television presenter
Federica Nargi (born 1990), Italian model, showgirl, television presenter and actress
Federica Nicolai (born 1995), Italian professional racing cyclist
Federica Panicucci (born 1967), Italian television host and radio personality
Federica Pellegrini (born 1988), Italian swimmer
Federica Radicchi (born 1988), Italian water polo player
Federica Ranchi (born 1939), Italian film actress
Federica Ridolfi (born 1974), Italian dancer and hostess on television
Federica Rocco (born 1984), water polo defender from Italy
Federica Sala (born 1993), Italian synchronised swimmer
Federica Sallusto (born 1961), Italian biologist
Federica Salva (born 1971), Italian yacht racer
Federica Sanfilippo (born 1990), Italian biathlete
Federica Scolari (born 1988), Italian dressage rider
Federica Selva (born 1996), Sammarinese alpine skier
Federica Silvera (born 1993), Uruguayan footballer and futsal player
Federica Stabilini (born 1957), Italian swimmer
Federica Stufi (born 1988), Italian volleyball player
Federica Valenti (born 1969), Italian voice actress
Victoria Federica de Marichalar y de Borbón (born 2000), daughter of the Duchess and Duke of Lugo, and sixth in the line of succession to the Spanish throne

See also 

 12817 Federica (1996 FM16), main-belt asteroid

Italian feminine given names